This is a list of sex worker organizations which advocate for sex workers' rights.
Almost all sex worker organizations around the world favour the decriminalization of sex work, and have that goal as a primary objective. In locations where sex work is not criminalized, sex worker movements advocate for access to other kinds of rights such as unemployment, changes in zoning, and working to eliminate the social stigma attached to sexual labor.

International

Supportive 
These international organizations are not primarily led by sex workers, nor do their activities primarily concern sex work, but nonetheless, they have dedicated a significant portion of their efforts to advocating for sex workers' rights, including decriminalization. Literature describes such supportive organizations as "allies".

Africa

Angola

Benin

Botswana

Burkina Faso

Burundi

Cameroon

Central African Republic

Democratic Republic of the Congo

Ethiopia

Ghana

Kenya

Malawi

Mali

Mozambique

Namibia

Nigeria

Rwanda

Senegal

South Africa

South Sudan

Tanzania

Togo

Uganda

Zambia

Zimbabwe

Asia

Bangladesh

Cambodia

China

East Timor

Hong Kong

India

Indonesia

Japan

Kazakhstan

Kyrgyzstan

Malaysia

Mongolia

Myanmar

Nepal

Pakistan

Philippines

Singapore

South Korea

Taiwan

Thailand

Turkey

Vietnam

Europe

Armenia

Austria

Belgium

Bosnia and Herzegovina

Czech Republic

Denmark

Finland

France

Georgia

Germany

Greece

Hungary

Ireland

Italy

Lithuania

Luxembourg

Macedonia

Montenegro

Netherlands

Norway

Poland

Portugal

Romania

Russia

Serbia

Spain

Sweden

Switzerland

Ukraine

United Kingdom

North America

Belize

Canada

El Salvador

Haiti

Jamaica

Mexico

Nicaragua

Panama

Trinidad and Tobago

United States

Supportive

Oceania

Australia

Fiji

New Zealand

Papua New Guinea

South America

Argentina

Brazil

Colombia

Ecuador

Guyana

Peru

Suriname

See also 

 Decriminalization of sex work
 Sex workers' rights § Movement

References

External links

 

 
Lists of organizations
Sexuality-related lists